Trobu is one of the constituencies represented in the Parliament of Ghana. It elects one Member of Parliament (MP) by the first past the post system of election. Moses Anim is the current member of parliament for the constituency. He was elected on the ticket of the New Patriotic Party (NPP) won a majority of 48,948 votes.

Members of Parliament

See also
List of Ghana Parliament constituencies

References 

Parliamentary constituencies in the Greater Accra Region